Chicoreus austramosus is a species of sea snail, a marine gastropod mollusk in the family Muricidae, the murex snails or rock snails.

Description
 Size 4–6 cm

Distribution
 Durban, Rep. South Africa

References

Gastropods described in 1978
Chicoreus